James Tomlinson (2 February 1881 – 21 February 1963) was a professional footballer who made one appearance as a centre half in the Football League for Blackburn Rovers.

Career statistics

References

1881 births
1963 deaths
English footballers
People from Darwen
English Football League players
Blackburn Rovers F.C. players
Nelson F.C. players
Darwen F.C. players
Brentford F.C. players
Norwich City F.C. players
Bolton Wanderers F.C. players
Reading F.C. players
Southern Football League players
Chorley F.C. players
Association football wing halves